The 2015–16 season is Blackburn Rovers' 128th season as a professional football club and its fourth playing in the Championship. Along with competing in the Championship, the club will also participate in the FA Cup and League Cup. The season covers the period from 1 July 2015 to 30 June 2016.

Summer Activity

On 12 May Rovers announced a new sponsorship deal with Dafabet.

On 16 May Rovers announced their retained list and Matthew Kilgallon & Lee Williamson had their contracts extended by a further 12 months. It was also confirmed long serving players David Dunn & Paul Robinson would be leaving the club upon the expiration of their contracts whilst Josh King & youth player Darragh Lenihan who made his 1st team appearance last season had been offered new contracts. Chris Taylor & Luke Varney were free to talk to other clubs.

On 28 May it was announced that Rovers forward Josh King would join Premier League new boys AFC Bournemouth upon the expiration of his contract.

On 25 June it was announced Luke Varney will undergo rehab at Ipswich Town upon leaving Rovers.

On 26 June Rovers announced Tom Cairney will be joining Fulham.

On 1 July Rovers announced Ryan Nyambe has signed his first professional contract, the defender has signed a 3-year deal, Also penning new deals at are Ryan Crump, Jack Doyle, Mark Edgar, Anton Forrester, Sam Joel, Sam Lavelle and Connor Thomson. They have each signed new one-year contracts, whilst Hyuga Tanner and Luke Wall have signed extensions to their Academy scholarships.

On 1 July Rovers announced Darragh Lenihan has signed a one-year deal.

On 1 July Rovers announced Josh Morris will be joining Bradford City.

On 2 July Rovers announced Chris Taylor had signed a new one-year deal.

On 8 July Rovers announced Leon Best had been released by mutual consent.

On 21 July 2015 Rovers announced their first and second signings of the summer transfer window, with the free agents Sacha Petshi signing a one-year deal with an option of a second year and fellow Frenchmen Bengali-Fodé Koita signing a two-year deal with Rovers.

On 31 July Rovers announced Jake Kean had been released by mutual consent.

On 31 July Rovers announced Rudy Gestede had joined Aston Villa.

On 5 August Rovers announced their third signing of the summer with free agent Danny Guthrie signing a two-year deal.

On 6 August Rovers announced their fourth signing of the summer with free agent Nathan Delfouneso signing a one-year deal.

On 10 August Rovers announced the loan signing of Modou Barrow from Swansea City until the 10 November.

On 11 August Rovers announced the signing of Reading center midfielder Hope Akpan after his contract was terminated by Reading, and completed a two-year contract to join Rovers.

On 21 August Rovers announced the loan signing of Tom Lawrence from Leicester City until 3 January.

Autumn activity
On 11 November Rovers confirmed Gary Bowyer had left the club, Assistant manager Terry McPhillips, First team coaches Craig Short & Tony Grant & goalkeeping coach John Keeley also left with immediate effect.

On 15 November Rovers confirmed Paul Lambert has been appointed as new manager, with Alan Irvine as his Assistant manager, Rob Kelly as a coach & Laurence Batty as goalkeeping coach.

On 20 November Rovers announced Corry Evans has committed his long term future to the club signing a contract extension until the summer of 2019.

On 24 November Rovers announced the loan signing of Doneil Henry from West Ham United until 3 January.

On 24 November Rovers announced John O'Sullivan has signed a contract extension until the summer of 2017.

On 26 November Rovers announced John O'Sullivan had joined Rochdale on loan until 3 January.

On 26 November Rovers announced Anton Forrester had joined Morecambe on loan until 3 January.

On 3 December Rovers announce they are now compliant with the Football League's Financial Fair Play regulations and will have their transfer embargo lifted.

On 10 December Rovers announced Craig Conway has committed his long term future to the club signing a contract extension until the summer of 2018.

Winter Activity

On 5 January Rovers announced that Tom Lawrence will remain on loan for a further month, until 31 January.

On 5 January Rovers announced the signing of Elliott Bennett on a 2 and half year deal, for an undisclosed fee from Norwich City.

On 15 January Rovers announced the signing of Simeon Jackson on a short term deal until the end of the season, on a free transfer following his release from Barnsley.

On 15 January Rovers announced John O'Sullivan had joined Bury on loan until the 13 February.

On 20 January Rovers announced signed of Danny Graham on loan from Sunderland until end of the season.

On 20 January Rovers announced the signing of Elliott Ward on a 2 and half year deal, on a free transfer from Bournemouth.

On 26 January Rovers announced Marcus Olsson will move to Derby County for an undisclosed fee.

On 27 January Rovers announced they have reached an agreement with Turkish team Kasımpaşa for the transfer of Bengali-Fodé Koita for a fee of 320,000 Euros.

On 29 January Rovers announced signed of Tony Watt on loan from Charlton Athletic until end of the season, with a fee agree to sign permanently in summer.

On 1 February Rovers announced Jordan Rhodes will join Middlesbrough for £9,000,000 with £2,000,000 add ons.

On 1 February Rovers announced Sacha Petshi has joined Créteil.

On 1 February Rovers announced signed of Jordi Gómez on loan from Sunderland until end of the season.

On 13 February Rovers announced signed of Matt Grimes on loan from Swansea City on a 93-day loan.

On 26 February Rovers announced Darragh Lenihan signed a new three-and-a-half-year deal.

Spring activity

On 17 March Rovers announced Chris Taylor, who is out of contract in the summer, has joined Millwall on loan until end of season.

On 18 March Paul Lambert says he will make the decision on the players who are out of contract in the summer when his budget is confirmed, Simon Eastwood, Tommy Spurr, Matthew Kilgallon, Chris Taylor, Lee Williamson, Nathan Delfouneso & Chris Brown are all out of contract in the summer.

On 18 March Rovers announced Nathan Delfouneso has joined Bury on loan until 19 April.

On 28 April Rovers announced that Paul Lambert will be leaving at the end of the current season.

Pre-Season Friendlies
On 15 May 2015, Blackburn Rovers announced six pre-season friendlies, Wigan Athletic, Bury, Oldham Athletic, Accrington Stanley, Rochdale and Tranmere Rovers.

Championship

League table

Result by round

Matches
On 17 June 2015, the fixtures for the forthcoming season were announced.

Football League Cup
On 16 June 2015, the first round draw was made, Blackburn Rovers were drawn at home against Shrewsbury Town.

FA Cup
Rovers will enter the FA Cup in the Third Round Proper which commences on 9 January 2016. On 7 December 2015, the third round draw was made, Blackburn Rovers were drawn away against Newport County.

Backroom Staff

Squad statistics

Appearances and goals

|-
|colspan="14"|Players out on loan:

|-
|colspan="14"|Players that played for Blackburn Rovers this season that have left the club:

|}

Goalscorers

 * left the club

Assists

 * left the club

Disciplinary record

 * left the club

Transfers

Summer

Transfers in

Total outgoing: ~£0 £0+/-

Loans in

Transfers out

Total incoming:  ~£10,950,000-£12,100,000+

Includes estimated 15% sell on fee (£450,000-£600,000) following Steven Nzonzi transfer from Stoke City to Sevilla 9 July 2015 and potential add-ons from the Tom Cairney sale.
 Sell-on clauses have been negotiated in the sales of Josh Morris and Tom Cairney.

Loans out

Winter

Transfers in

Total outgoing: ~£0 £0+/-

Transfers out

Total incoming:  ~£9.990,000-£14,240,000+

Loans in

Loans out

References

Blackburn Rovers
Blackburn Rovers F.C. seasons